The York River is a river in Renfrew County, Hastings County and Haliburton County in Ontario, Canada. The river is in the Saint Lawrence River drainage basin, and flows from the southern extension of Algonquin Provincial Park to the Madawaska River.

The river alternates between fast flowing portions in steep sided gorges to slower movement through post-glacial sand flats. In these are changes in the river course has created ox-bows and abandoned ox-bows that are now ponds and wetlands.

Course

The river begins in the southern extension of Algonquin Provincial Park at Yorkend Lake, in geographic Clyde Township in the municipality of Dysart et al, Haliburton County. It flows west out of the park through geographic Eyre Township and Harburn Township, then loops back east into the southernmost part of the park in geographic Bruton Township. It takes in the left tributary North York River just before Branch Lake, turns southeast, passes over the High Falls, and exits the park into Benoir Lake.

It continues east into Baptiste Lake where it enters geographic Herschel Township in the municipality of Hastings Highlands, Hastings County. The river leaves the lake south at the lake's southeast tip, controlled by the Ontario Ministry of Natural Resources-operated Baptiste Lake Dam, enters the town of Bancroft, and passes over the Bancroft Light & Power Generating Station and dam. The river is crossed by Ontario Highway 28 and Ontario Highway 62 in the town centre, then turns east and northeast. It is crossed again by Ontario Highway 28, passes over Egan Chute and Fram Chute at Egan Chutes Provincial Park, and briefly reenters Hastings Highlands at geographic Monteagle Township.

The river continues northeast into geographic Carlow Township in the municipality of Carlow/Mayo, passes over the Conroy Rapids and enters the Conroy Marsh, a  provincially significant wetland. As the river flows through the marsh, it first passes into the municipality of Brudenell, Lyndoch and Raglan, Renfrew County, then takes in the right tributary Little Mississippi River. The river then reaches its mouth as a right tributary of the Madawaska River in geographic Radcliffe Township in the municipality of Madawaska Valley, near the community of Mayhews Landing. The Madawska River flows via the Ottawa River to the Saint Lawrence River.

Waterfalls
 Egan Chute
 Farm Chute
 High Falls, Baptiste Lake (somewhat less dramatic as a result of the High Falls Dam which regulates the water level for Baptiste Lake)
 High Falls, Benoir Lake

Tributaries

Little Mississippi River (right)
Papineau Creek (left)
Alder Creek (left)
Salmon Trout Creek (left)
Mallard Creek (right)
Bresnahan Creek (left)
Bentley Creek (left)
L'Amable Creek (right)
Clark Creek (right)
Faraday Creek (right)
Baptiste Lake
McGarry Creek (left)
Hound Creek (left)
Hudson Creek (right)
Hamilton Creek (left)
Lighthouse Creek (left)
Chainy Creek (left)
Elephant Creek (right)
Benoir Lake
Allen Creek (right)
Fourcorner Creek (right)
Kingscote Creek (right)
Mink Creek (left)
North York River (left)
Clyde Creek (left)

History
In the second half of the 19th century, the river was used to transport logs out of the forests surrounding its watershed. Now, parts of this river have been turned into a provincial waterway park as well as a provincial nature reserve (at Egan Chute).

Popular culture
Group of Seven artist A. J. Casson painted a number of scenes from this region, including one titled "Conroy Marsh" and several along the York River itself.

See also
List of Ontario rivers

References

Sources

External links 

Rivers of Haliburton County
Rivers of Hastings County
Rivers of Renfrew County
Tributaries of the Ottawa River
Wetlands of Ontario